Dimitri Altaryov also transliterated as Dmitry Altaryоv (born August 13, 1980) is a Russian former professional ice hockey winger who most notably playing in the Kontinental Hockey League (KHL).

He was selected by the New York Islanders in the 9th round (264th overall) of the 2000 NHL Entry Draft.

Career statistics

References

External links

1980 births
Living people
Dizel Penza players
Metallurg Magnitogorsk players
New York Islanders draft picks
Rubin Tyumen players
Russian ice hockey left wingers
Torpedo Nizhny Novgorod players
HC Yugra players